Whitley College is a Baptist theological institute in Melbourne, Victoria, Australia. The college is associated with the Baptist Union of Victoria (Australian Baptist Ministries) and is one of the theological schools of the University of Divinity.

History 
Whitley College was established in 1891 by the Collins Street Baptist Church as Baptist Theological College of Victoria. William Thomas Whitley was invited to come to Melbourne from England to take up the position of Principal. He remained Principal for the next ten years.

In 1959, the Baptist Union of Victoria began work on a new building for the college and agreed to continue theological education while becoming an affiliated college of the University of Melbourne. In 1965, it was renamed Whitley College in honor of William Thomas Whitley. In 1975, Whitley and the Churches of Christ Theological College, now named Stirling Theological College established the Evangelical Theological Association, which was accredited until 2005. Whitley and Stirling now are separate colleges of the University of Divinity. Whitley College now continues solely as a theological college, based at 50 The Avenue, as a College of the University of Divinity. This is a university of specialisation which offers programs in theological and ministry studies, ranging from diploma-level through to doctoral research.

The Geoffrey Blackburn Library at Whitley was built in 2001 and contains approximately 30,000 theological books. It also contains the Boreham Collection, which includes books by and about Frank W. Boreham, as well as items from his personal collection.

Academics 
In conjunction with the University of Divinity, prospective students at Whitley College are provided with a variety of degrees and courses for further study. The college offers undergraduate diplomas, undergraduate degrees, as well as graduate certificates, graduate diplomas, and master's degrees.

Accreditation 
Whitley College is a teaching and research college within the University of Divinity. The University of Divinity was constituted by the University of Divinity Act 1910 (the Melbourne College of Divinity Act 1910), passed by the Parliament of Victoria. The Act, most recently amended in 2016, establishes the University Council and empowers it to confer awards as a higher education provider.

Awards and prizes 
Whitley College awards an annual prize for excellence in writing, named in honour of a notable author and theologian, Frederick Buechner. All students are encouraged to submit pieces and winners of the prize are selected by faculty members.

School of World Mission
The School of World Mission was established in 1988 by Whitley College and World Vision Australia. SWM was located at Whitley College and taught practical ministry and mission courses and integrated biblical theology with social sciences. The School of World Mission is now closed.

Living at Whitley
From 1965 - 2017 Whitley College served as one of the twelve residential colleges of the University of Melbourne. Unlike most colleges, Whitley College was not located on College Crescent but is placed slightly further north at 271 Royal Parade, Victoria, Australia. Unlike most other colleges associated with the university (the other exception being Trinity College), with a total 130 residents, Whitley College was one of the smaller colleges affiliated with the University of Melbourne. Whitey College as a residential college of the University of Melbourne is now closed.

Notable alumni
 Tim Costello - CEO of World Vision Australia and former President of the Baptist Union of Australia
 Rowan Downing QC - President United Nations Dispute Tribunal, UN-appointed judge, Khmer Rouge War Crimes Tribunal, Cambodia & Justice, Court of Appeal, Vanuatu
 Matthew Hopcraft - Masterchef contestant

References

External links
 Whitley College website

Baptist seminaries and theological colleges in Australia
University of Divinity
Educational institutions established in 1891
1891 establishments in Australia
Buildings and structures in the City of Melbourne (LGA)